Huntersville is an unincorporated community in Franklin County, Indiana, in the United States.

History
Huntersville was laid out in 1841. Hunter was likely the name of one of its founders.

References

Unincorporated communities in Franklin County, Indiana
Unincorporated communities in Indiana